The NIH MERIT award (Method To Extend Research in Time) Award (R37) was created by the National Institutes of Health in 1986. 
It is a prestigious award designed to provide stable, long-term funding support to outstanding, experienced investigators whose productivity is distinctly superior and who are deemed highly likely to continue to perform their research activities in an outstanding manner. The MERIT award provided funding for 5 years and could be renewed for up to 10 years. Unlike most NIH grant awards, the MERIT award can not be applied for by the investigator. Researchers submitting an R01 that receives a fundable score are considered for the award. In 2018, the NIH began awarding MERIT awards to "Early Stage Investigators", who are in the first 10 years of their career.

Notable MERIT award recipients

References 

1986 establishments in the United States
American education awards
National Institutes of Health